The governor of Transylvania was a viceroy representing the Habsburg monarchs in the Principality (from 1765 Grand Principality) of Transylvania between 1691 and 1867.

List of governors

Seventeenth century

Eighteenth century

Nineteenth century

See also
 List of rulers of Transylvania
 List of chancellors of Transylvania
 Voivode of Transylvania

Footnotes

References

  Fallenbüchl, Zoltán (1988). Magyarország főméltóságai [=High Dignitaries in Hungary]. Maecenas Könyvkiadó. .
  Markó, László: A magyar állam főméltóságai Szent Istvántól napjainkig – Életrajzi Lexikon.  (The High Officers of the Hungarian State from Saint Stephen to the Present Days – A Biographical Encyclopedia) (2nd edition); Helikon Kiadó Kft., 2006, Budapest; .
 Treptow, Kurt W.; Popa, Marcel (1996). Historical Dictionary of Romania. Scarecrow Press, Inc. .

History of Transylvania (1683–1848)
History of Transylvania (1848–1867)